Jason Hewlett (born 1978) is an American speaker, entertainer, author, impressionist, and corporate events headliner known for his "clean," "family friendly" comedy and inspiring leadership messaging on his book, The Promise To The One.

Personal life
Jason Hewlett was born in Salt Lake City, Utah in 1978 to John and Marsha Hewlett. Hewlett’s mother, formerly Marsha Redford, is a cousin of actor Robert Redford. He is married to Tami Spenst Hewlett and has 4 children.

Hewlett’s Great Grandfather, Lester Franklin Hewlett, was President of the Mormon Tabernacle Choir from 1938–1962, during which time the choir won a Grammy in 1959 for its recording of “The Battle Hymn of The Republic” in the vocal group/chorus category, of which Hewlett’s Great-Grandmother, Margaret Stewart Hewlett was a choir member.

Career
Hewlett began his professional career after his post-high school service as a Mormon missionary in the Florianopolis, Brazil Mission ended in 1999. One of his early gigs was as a half-time entertainer for University of Utah & Brigham Young University basketball games. In 2001, he began working with the Las Vegas based Legends in Concert as both a Ricky Martin and Elton John impersonator.

In 2002, he left Legends and worked professionally, and became a corporate events headliner. Devin Thorpe of Forbes said: "He’s become one of the most sought after corporate entertainers in the business because his fall-off-your-chair funny material is absolutely safe for work."

In 2004, Hewlett was courted by multiple casinos in Las Vegas to manage and create his one-man show.  Based upon creative differences and demands that he change his act from family appropriate to be more adult, he turned all offers away and continued performing at corporate events and speaking to youth in school assemblies.

In 2011, Hewlett announced his retirement from public events and solely performs and speaks for corporate and youth events, only occasionally allowing his draw to be used for charitable causes and fundraisers, although performing privately for numerous charities on a regular basis.

In 2014, Hewlett performed his one-man show for the National Speakers Association Foundation Event. The same year he was invited to perform a US Military Tour throughout the Middle East and Southwest Asia on US Military stations and bases in Kuwait, Bahrain, Djibouti, Addis-Ababa, and Afghanistan during wartime for Armed Forces Entertainment along with other Latter Day Saints Artists including David Archuleta, Dan Clark, and Dean Kaelin.

In 2016, Hewlett was invited by the National Speakers Association to be the Keynote Speaker for the national Influence conference for his peers. At this same event, he was inducted into the Speaker Hall of Fame as one of the youngest recipients to be named a CPAE (Council of Peers Award of Excellence).

Acting
In 1997 Hewlett played the lead role in "Crayoluv", a short film by director Tucker Dansie.

Religious
Hewlett is a member of The Church of Jesus Christ of Latter-Day Saints, also referred to as Mormons. He references his religion in his speaking and performing as a comedy routine in order to make everyone feel connected rather than segregated.

Author
His book, Signature Moves: How To Stand Out in a Sit Down World was published in 2014 by Peak Bagger Publishing. Hewlett’s latest book, The Promise To The One was published by Sound Wisdom. The eBook launched May 13, 2020 as the #1 Hot Release in the category of Spiritual Self-Help on Amazon. Paperback and Audiobook launched on August 7, 2020.

Musician
His original music and album, “Good To Me”, is featured on iTunes and his popular song, “My 8-ft. Tall Doll (The Chewbacca Song)” is known among youth audiences.

Controversy and viral post
On December 1, 2015 Hewlett’s Facebook post about seeing his wife at retail store Target became a viral internet post the world over, as it got headlined in news outlets and media as, “Man Cheats on Wife - Breaks The Internet". Within 24 hours of posting, it was featured on the Today Show web site, within 48 hours it had been highlighted as the top story on BusinessInsider, GoogleAds, Yahoo!, and in People magazine. Within 72 hours the Hewlett couple’s story was appearing on news outlets from Italy to Singapore and Australia, among others, as well as the family received multiple Reality TV Show offers from Hollywood producers (all of which were turned away), and Hewlett’s name was trending higher than Kim Kardashian as the top trending name in the world. As favorable as the attention was at first, Hewlett was also accused of creating “click-bait” with his post, and received multiple negative reviews of his writing, specifically from Cosmopolitan, The TV show The View, and multiple popular bloggers. His post was shared by celebrities such as George Takei, Zooey Deschanel, and boxer Manny Pacquiao. The original post on his Facebook Page has reached over 35 million views and more than 238,000 shares and on his personal profile over 82,000 shares.

Awards and recognition
Best Specialty Act or Variety Performance in the Arts & Entertainment Category, Best of State Awards - Utah (2010).
Best Individual Vocalist in the Arts & Entertainment Category, Best of State Awards - Utah (2013).
Certified Speaking Profession (CSP) designation by the National Speakers Association (less than 5% of speakers receive) (2014). 
Outstanding Eagle Scout Award from the National Eagle Scout Association (only 1250 have been awarded since its introduction in 2011 through 2015).
The STAR Award from the SCERA Center for the Arts in Orem, Utah (lifetime achievement award - 2016).
Speaker Hall of Fame aka CPAE (Council of Peers Award for Excellence) induction from the National Speakers Association (less than 1% of speakers) (2016).

References

External links
 Official website
 Jason Hewlett as the Keynote Speaker at LifeVantage

American male film actors
American impressionists (entertainers)
Living people
American male writers
1978 births
21st-century American comedians